Richard Batson (11 June 1891 – 25 January 1971) was a Barbadian cricketer. He played in six first-class matches for the Barbados cricket team from 1909 to 1923.

See also
 List of Barbadian representative cricketers

References

External links
 

1891 births
1971 deaths
Barbadian cricketers
Barbados cricketers
People from Saint Michael, Barbados